Andrea Vassallo may refer to:
Andrea Vassallo (architect) (1856–1928), Maltese architect
Andrea Vassallo (footballer) (born 1997), Italian footballer